Nancy Wu (born 9 September 1981) is a Hong Kong actress contracted to TVB and Shaw Brothers Pictures.

Wu had won TVB Anniversary Award for Best Actress award at the TVB Anniversary Awards in 2015 and 2016 consecutively.

Career 
In 1999, Nancy Wu participated in TVB's 18th Annual New Talent Singing Awards competition and finished in the fourth place.

In 2001, she entered TVB's 3rd Annual Cover Girl Competition and won the Most Photogenic Award, the Most Fit Award, the Most Attractive Award, and the Overall Winner Award. Following that, she enrolled in the 18th TVB Acting Class and entered the entertainment industry.

In November 2012, Wu received a Long Service Award from TVB for her contributions to the company. She was also awarded the TVB Star Awards Malaysia for My Favourite Supporting Actress in November 2012, Asian Television Award, as well as TVB Anniversary Awards for Best Supporting Actress in December 2012.

In 2015 and 2016 respectively, Wu had received TVB Anniversary Award for Best Actress awards twice in a row during TVB Anniversary Awards and also for Favourite TVB Actress in TVB Star Awards Malaysia.

For the last few years, Wu had been continuously nominated for major awards during TVB Anniversary Awards, TVB Star Awards Malaysia and also in StarHub TVB Award in Singapore.

Furthermore, Wu had been involved in other works such as in a 2018 stage play By Chance: Xu Zhimo with Steven Ma and also in films such as Men on the Dragon in the same year where she was nominated in 2019 during the 38th Hong Kong Film Awards for a Best New Performer.

In 2020, Wu signed a contract with Shaw Brothers Pictures.

Personal life
Nancy Wu is best friends with Myolie Wu, Paisley Wu, Elaine Yiu, Selena Lee and Mandy Wong. They had formed the friendship group “胡說八道會” and had filmed a travel show together. She also became good friends with Rosina Lam when filming the drama Short End of the Stick.

Due to their common interest in long-distance running, Wu along with Benjamin Yuen, Joel Chan, Brian Tse, Jack Wu, Paisley Wu, Elaine Yiu, Selena Lee and Mandy Wong formed the group “Crazy Runner”.

Filmography

Television dramas (TVB)

Television dramas (Shaw Brothers Pictures)

Films 
 Men on the Dragon (2018)

Discography

Drama Soundtracks

Awards and nominations

2000 
 TVB Magazine 3rd Annual CoverGirl Competition: Mei Bo Lin Most Attractive Award
 TVB Magazine 3rd Annual CoverGirl Competition: Nikon Most Photogenic Award
 TVB Magazine 3rd Annual CoverGirl Competition: California Fitness Most Fit Award 
 TVB Magazine 3rd Annual CoverGirl Competition: Overall Winner Award

2007 
 TVB Anniversary Awards: Most Improved Female Artiste Nomination

2008 
 Strictly Come Dancing – Season II: 2nd Runner-up
 TVB Anniversary Awards: TVB.com Popular Award Nomination (Top 2)
 TVB Anniversary Awards: Best Supporting Actress Top 5 Nomination (The Silver Chamber of Sorrows)
 TVB Anniversary Awards: Most Improved Female Artiste

2010 
 TVB Anniversary Awards: Best Supporting Actress Top 5 Nomination (Gun Metal Grey)
 My Astro On Demand Favourites Awards: My Favourite Supporting Actress Top 5 Nomination (No Regrets)

2011 
 My Astro On Demand Favourites Awards: My Favourite Potential Female Artiste 
 My Astro On Demand Favourites Awards: My Favourite Supporting Actress Top 5 Nomination (Gun Metal Grey)
 My Astro On Demand Favourites Awards: My Favourite On-screen Couple Top 5 Nomination (Gun Metal Grey with Vincent Wong)
 StarHub TVB Awards: My Favourite TVB Female Drama Characters Nomination (Gun Metal Grey)
 TVB Anniversary Awards: Best Supporting Actress Top 5 Nomination (Forensic Heroes III)

2012 
 StarHub TVB Awards: My Favourite TVB Female Drama Characters Nomination (Gloves Come Off)
 TVB Anniversary Awards: Best Supporting Actress (Gloves Come Off) 
 My Astro On Demand Favourites Awards: My Favourite Supporting Actress (Gloves Come Off) 
 Asian Television Award: Best Supporting Actress (Gloves Come Off)

2013 
 TVB Star Awards Malaysia: Favourite TVB Supporting Actress (Triumph in the Skies II) 
 TVB Star Awards Malaysia: Top 15 Favourite TVB Drama Characters (Triumph in the Skies II) 
 TVB Star Awards Malaysia: Favourite TVB On-screen Couple (Triumph in the Skies II with Him Law)
 TVB Anniversary Awards: Best Supporting Actress Nomination (Triumph in the Skies II)
 TVB Anniversary Awards: Most Popular Female Character Nomination (Triumph in the Skies II)

2014 
StarHub TVB Awards: My Favourite TVB Female TV Characters (The Ultimate Addiction) 
 StarHub TVB Awards: My Favourite TVB Supporting Actress Nomination (Gilded Chopsticks)
 TVB Star Awards Malaysia: Top 15 Favourite TVB Drama Characters (The Ultimate Addiction)
 TVB Star Awards Malaysia: Favourite TVB Actress Nomination (Overachievers)
 TVB Anniversary Awards: Best Actress Nomination (Overachievers)
 TVB Anniversary Awards: Most Popular Female Character Nomination (Overachievers)
 TVB Anniversary Awards: Best Supporting Actress Nomination (Gilded Chopsticks)

2015 
 StarHub TVB Awards: My Favourite TVB Female Drama Characters (Ghost of Relativity) 
 StarHub TVB Awards: My Favourite TVB Actress Nomination (Ghost of Relativity) 
 TVB Star Awards Malaysia: My Favourite TVB Actress (Ghost of Relativity) 
 TVB Star Awards Malaysia: Top 16 Favourite TVB Drama Characters (Ghost of Relativity)
 Yahoo!Asia Buzz Awards: Most Searched Female TV Artistes 
 TVB Anniversary Awards: Best Actress (Ghost of Relativity) 
 TVB Anniversary Awards: Most Popular Female Character Top 5 Nomination (Ghost of Relativity)

2016 
 StarHub TVB Awards: My Favourite On-screen Couple (A Fist Within Four Walls with Ruco Chan)
 StarHub TVB Awards: My Favourite TVB Theme Song (Never Know You Are the Best with Ruco Chan)
 StarHub TVB Awards: My Favourite TVB Actress (A Fist Within Four Walls) 
 StarHub TVB Awards: My Favourite TVB Female Drama Characters Nomination (A Fist Within Four Walks)
 StarHub TVB Awards: My Favourite TVB On-screen Couple (House of Spirits with Bobby Au-yeung)
 TVB Star Awards Malaysia: My Favourite TVB Actress (A Fist Within Four Walls)
 TVB Star Awards Malaysia: Top 15 Favourite TVB Drama Characters (A Fist Within Four Walls)
 TVB Star Awards Malaysia) Favourite TVB On-screen Couple (A Fist Within Four Walls with Ruco Chan)
 TVB Star Awards Malaysia: Favourite TVB Drama Theme Song (Never Know You Are the Best with Ruco Chan)
 TVB Anniversary Awards: Best Actress (A Fist Within Four Walls)
 TVB Anniversary Awards: Most Popular Female Character Top 5 Nomination (A Fist Within Four Walls)
 TVB Anniversary Awards: Most Popular Drama Theme Song (Never Know You Are the Best with Ruco Chan)
People's Choice Television Awards: People’s Choice Best Actress Top 5 Nomination (A Fist Within Four Walls)

2017 
 StarHub TVB Awards: My Favourite TVB Female Drama Characters (The Unholy Alliance) 
 StarHub TVB Awards: My Favourite TVB Actress Top 3 Nomination (The Unholy Alliance)
 TVB Star Awards Malaysia:  Favourite TVB On-screen couple (The Unholy Alliance with Ruco Chan)
 TVB Star Awards Malaysia: Top 17 Favourite TVB Drama Characters (The Unholy Alliance)
 TVB Star Awards Malaysia: My Favourite TVB Actress Top 3 Nomination (The Unholy Alliance)
 TVB Star Awards Malaysia: Favourite TVB Show Host Top 5 Nomination (The Sisterhood Traveling Gang with Myolie Wu, Mandy Wong, Elaine Yiu, Selena Lee and Paisley Wu)
 TVB Anniversary Awards: Best Actress Top 5 Nomination (The Unholy Alliance)
 TVB Anniversary Awards: Most Popular Female Character Top 5 Nomination (The Unholy Alliance)
 TVB Anniversary Awards: Most Popular On-screen Partnership Nomination (The Unholy Alliance with Ruco Chan)
 TVB Anniversary Awards: Most Popular On-screen Partnership Nomination (The Sisterhood Traveling Gang with Myolie Wu, Mandy Wong, Elaine Yiu, Selena Lee and Paisley Wu)

2018
 TVB Anniversary Gala: Favourite TVB Actress in Singapore Top 3 Nomination (Deep in the Realm of Conscience)
 TVB Anniversary Gala: Favourite TVB Actress Top 3 Nomination (Deep in the Realm of Conscience)
 TVB Anniversary Awards: Best Actress Top 5 Nomination (Deep in the Realm of Conscience) 
 TVB Anniversary Awards: Most Popular Female Character Top 5 Nomination (Deep in the Realm of Conscience)
 TVB Anniversary Awards: Best Theme Song Nomination (Deep in the Realm of Conscience with Steven Ma)
 Golden Melody Award for Song of the Year: Best Theme Song (Deep in the Realm of Conscience) 
 People's Choice Television Awards: Best Actress Top 5 Nomination (Deep in the Realm of Conscience)

2019
 38th Hong Kong Film Awards: Best New Performer Nomination (Men On The Dragon)
 TVB Anniversary Awards: Best Actress Nomination (Justice Bao: The First Year)

2022
 TVB Anniversary Awards: Best Actress Top 10 Nomination (Big White Duel II) 
 TVB Anniversary Awards: Most Popular Female Character Nomination (Big White Duel II)
 TVB Anniversary Awards: Favourite TVB Actress in Malaysia Top 5 Nomination (Big White Duel II)
 TVB Anniversary Awards: Most Popular Onscreen Partnership Nomination (Big White Duel II with Kenneth Ma and Natalie Tong)
 TVB Anniversary Awards: Best Outfit Award for Female Artiste

References

External links 
 
  
  Nancy's Blog
  Official TVB Blog

|-

|-
! colspan="3" style="background: #DAA520;" | Asian Television Awards
|-

|-
! colspan="3" style="background: #DAA520;" | My AOD Favourite Awards
|-

|-
! colspan="3" style="background: #DAA520;" | TVB Anniversary Awards
|-

1981 births
Living people
TVB veteran actors
Hong Kong television actresses
21st-century Hong Kong women singers
21st-century Hong Kong actresses